The Godley River is an alpine braided river flowing through Canterbury, in New Zealand's South Island.

The river's headwaters are in Aoraki / Mount Cook National Park.

Rivers of Canterbury, New Zealand
Braided rivers in New Zealand
Rivers of New Zealand